Simple Shoes, also known as Simple, is an American footwear brand created in 1991 by Eric Meyer, a California native.  Simple was acquired by Deckers Outdoor Corporation in 1993, then closed by Deckers in 2011, and subsequently acquired by Denis Ryan in 2015.

History 
To obtain start up capital, Eric sold his vintage Volkswagen collection. Simple Shoes was a pioneer in sustainable manufacturing and is known for being one of the first to use green sustainable materials, such as bamboo, jute, hemp, recycled PET, used tires and cork.

References

External links 
Official website

Shoe companies of the United States
Santa Barbara, California